Khamis Juma Suedi Kagasheki (born 30 August 1951) is a Tanzanian CCM politician and Member of Parliament for Bukoba Town constituency since 2005. He was the Minister of Natural Resources and Tourism.

Mr. Khamis J. Suedi, a career diplomat worked at the Tanzanian Permanent Mission to the United Nations in New York (1977-1982).  Headed the Economic Section in the Department of Legal and International Organizations in the Ministry of Foreign Affairs, Dar es Salaam, Tanzania from 1982-1987.  Also worked at the Tanzanian Permanent Mission to the United Nations Office in Geneva (1987-1990).

Mr. Suedi joined the World Intellectual Property Organization (WIPO) in January 1990 and in October of the same year, he became Director for Relations with International Organizations and Promotion of Innovations in Developing Countries.  In 1995, he became Director, Industrial Property Human Resources Development and Inter-Agency Affairs Department.  In 1997, he became Director for the Office of Strategic Planning and Policy Development.

References

1951 births
Living people
Tanzanian Muslims
Chama Cha Mapinduzi MPs
Tanzanian MPs 2010–2015
Government ministers of Tanzania
Kahororo Secondary School alumni
Fordham University alumni